The Dominican Republic with its OTI member station Telesistema 11, was one of the founding countries of the OTI Festival and participated in the very first edition of the show in Madrid in 1972. Since then, the country participated almost uninterruptedly in the event. The Caribbean country only withdrew from the event in 1976, but one year later, the broadcaster rejoined the show and participated till the last edition in 2000 in Acapulco.

History 
The Dominican Republic never managed to get a victory in the OTI Festival, but had a successful participation during the most of its history and ended several times in the top 10 places of the classification.

Fernando Casado was the very first Dominican representative in the contest and placed seventh with his song "Siempre habrá en la luna una sonrisa" (There will always be a smile on the moon) which was written by the well known Spanish composer Augusto Algueró.

One year later in Belo Horizonte, the Dominican Republic recorded one of its greatest successes in the contest with Niní Cáffaro and his song "El juicio final" (The final judgement), which placed third with 9 points.

In Madrid in 1977, Fernando Casado was selected again by Telesistema 11 to represent the Dominican Republic in the contest with the song "Al nacer cada enero" (To be born every January) which placed second and became a hit in the island.

After some other successful participations, Telesistema 11 selected the singer Taty Salas with her ballad "Olvidar, Olvidar" (To forget...to forget) which achieved second place again. Salas was selected again by the Dominican broadcaster in 1988, and although she didn't repeat the success of her previous entry, she placed third with the song "De tu boca" (From your mouth).

In 1989, Telesistema 11, determined to record a Dominican victory once for all, contacted the prominent singer Juan Luis Guerra, who composed the power ballad "Te ofrezco" (I offer you) which was sung by Maridalia Hernández. Although the song placed third and didn't win, this entry was widely acclaimed both by the jury and by the audience to the point that today, it's considered to be one of the best entries in the history of the OTI Festival.

The following Dominican entries were not as successful as before but the country managed to place respectably in the last years of the contest.

Contestants

References 

OTI Festival
Dominican Republic music